A splenocyte can be any one of the different white blood cell types as long as it is situated in the spleen or purified from splenic tissue.

Splenocytes consist of a variety of cell populations such as T and B lymphocytes, dendritic cells and macrophages, which have different immune functions.

References

Spleen (anatomy)
Mononuclear phagocytes
Leukocytes
Cell biology